State Road 219 (NM 219) is a  state highway in the US state of New Mexico. NM 219's southern terminus is at U.S. Route 54 (US 54) in Pastura, and the northern terminus is at Interstate 40 (I-40) and US 84 north of Pastura.

Major intersections

See also

References

219
Transportation in Guadalupe County, New Mexico